Zasip is a village in the Municipality of Bled in the Upper Carniola region of northwestern Slovenia.

Name

Zasip was attested in written sources in 1075–90 as Zazib. The name is derived from the prepositional phrase *za sipi 'behind the upper part of a scree slope', thus referring to the local geographical feature. In the local dialect, the settlement is known as Zâsp.

Geography

History
When the settlement was first mentioned in a 1075 deed, the area belonged to the Imperial March of Carniola. A parish was founded here in 1296. 

Today, there are three churches in the village. The parish church is dedicated to Saint John the Baptist was already mentioned in the 13th century. It was originally a Gothic building, although it was renovated to a large extent in the Baroque style in 1778. A small church dedicated to Saint Catherine stands on Hom Hill above the village. It is an old pilgrimage church, dating from around 1400 with some early 16th-century additions and 18th-century renovations. A third church dedicated to the Holy Trinity stands in the hamlet of Sebenje. It is a late-Gothic building with Baroque ornamentation.

References

External links

Zasip at Geopedia

Populated places in the Municipality of Bled